The National Information Infrastructure (NII) was the product of the High Performance Computing Act of 1991. It was a telecommunications policy buzzword, which was popularized during the Clinton Administration under the leadership of Vice-President Al Gore.

It proposed to build communications networks, interactive services, interoperable computer hardware and software, computers, databases, and consumer electronics in order to put vast amounts of information available to both public and private sectors. NII was to have included more than just the physical facilities (more than the cameras, scanners, keyboards, telephones, fax machines, computers, switches, compact disks, video and audio tape, cable, wire, satellites, optical fiber transmission lines, microwave nets, switches, televisions, monitors, and printers) used to transmit, store, process, and display voice, data, and images; it was also to encompass a wide range of interactive functions, user-tailored services, and multimedia databases that were interconnected in a technology-neutral manner that will favor no one industry over any other.

See also
Al Gore and information technology
High Performance Computing Act of 1991
Information Superhighway
History of the Internet
NII Award

References

Chapman, Gary and Marc Rotenberg. "The National Information Infrastructure: A Public Interest Opportunity." Summer, 1993.
Gore, Al. Remarks on the National Information Infrastructure by Vice President Al Gore at the National Press club, December 21, 1993.

History of the Internet
Internet terminology
Telecommunications in the United States